Valter Bombassei De Bona (born 27 May 1965 in Auronzo di Cadore) is an Italian curler.

At the international level, he is a 2006 European Mixed Curling Championship silver medallist.

At the national level, he is a three-time Italian men's champion curler and a two-time Italian mixed champion curler.

Teams

Men's

Mixed

Private life
His cousin is Diego Bombassei, also an Italian curler, they was teammates played on European and World championships.

References

External links

Valter Bombassei De Bona - FISG - Federazione Italiana Sport del Ghiaccio
Walter Bombassei De Bona - FISG - Federazione Italiana Sport del Ghiaccio

Living people
1965 births
Sportspeople from the Province of Belluno
Italian male curlers
Italian curling champions